Buzi-ye Seyf (also Romanized as Būzī-ye Seyf; also known as Bozīyeh, Būz, Būzī, and Buzīyeh) is a village in Buzi Rural District, in the Central District of Shadegan County, Khuzestan Province, Iran. At the 2006 census, its population was 2,284, in 394 families.

References 

Populated places in Shadegan County